Atherina is a genus of fish of silverside family Atherinidae, found in the temperate and tropic zones. Up to 15 cm long, they are widespread in the Mediterranean, Black Sea, Sea of Azov in lagoons and estuaries. It comes to the low stream of the Dnieper, Southern Bug, Dniester and Danube Rivers.

Species
There are currently five recognized species in this genus:
 Atherina boyeri A. Risso, 1810 (Big-scale sand smelt)
 Atherina breviceps Valenciennes, 1835 (Cape silverside)
 Atherina hepsetus Linnaeus, 1758 (Mediterranean sand smelt)
 Atherina lopeziana Rossignol & Blache, 1961 	
 Atherina presbyter G. Cuvier, 1829 (Sand smelt)

Commercial importance
Species of Atherina are objects in the traditional Italian, Catalan, Occitan, south-Ukrainian, Turkish, and Greek cuisine in fried form. The fish are lightly powdered with wheat flour before being dropped in hot olive oil. In Ukraine and Greece, it is commercially important species.

Fossil record
These fishes lived from the Eocene age to Miocene (from 55.8 to 11.608 million years ago). Fossils have been found in Kazakhstan and in Italy.

References

 
Atherininae
Ray-finned fish genera
Taxa named by Carl Linnaeus
Taxonomy articles created by Polbot